Gymnopternus aerosus is a species of fly in the family Dolichopodidae. It is found in the  Palearctic .

References

External links
Images representing Gymnopternus aerosus at BOLD

Dolichopodinae
Insects described in 1823
Asilomorph flies of Europe
Taxa named by Carl Fredrik Fallén